The Kronberg Academy is an academy of chamber music based in Kronberg, Hesse, Germany. It was founded in 1993 by Raimund Trenkler, who has served since then as its chairman and artistic director. The academy's initial focus was on the cello and supporting young cellists, but it now trains and sponsors gifted young players of the violin, viola, and cello, and organizes a diverse range of musical projects and concerts, including an international festival of strings. It was granted charitable status in 2004.

Study programmes
The Kronberg Academy Foundation offers study programmes that are unique within Europe. These include a Bachelor and Master programme for outstanding young musicians who have the potential to build international careers as soloists. The course is designed for a maximum of 25 individuals, lasts a total of three years and is offered in collaboration with the Frankfurt University of Music and Performing Arts. The Kronberg Academy Professional Studies programme builds on this, and is a two-year course focussing on musical concert practice. The Kronberg Academy Precollege programme is intended for instrumentalists who, at 16 or 17 years of age, are too young to apply for the Kronberg Academy Bachelor programme. Since autumn 2018, the Sir András Schiff Performance Programme for Young Pianists has offered a new chamber music programme to top class young pianists who wish to focus on chamber music.

Professors
Professors for the Kronberg Academy study programmes are Ana Chumachenco, Christian Tetzlaff, Antje Weithaas, Mihaela Martin, Nobuko Imai, Tabea Zimmermann, Wolfgang Emanuel Schmidt and Frans Helmerson. Martin Helmchen also works with the students as a tutor for "Duo Performance". Other internationally renowned artists, such as Gidon Kremer, Gary Hoffman, Mauricio Fuks, Yuri Bashmet, András Schiff, Antoine Tamestit and Christoph Eschenbach, regularly teach the students in internal masterclasses. The Sir András Schiff Performance Programme for Young Pianists is led by András Schiff; additional tutors are Kirill Gerstein, Ferenc Rados, Dénes Várjon and Rita Wagner.

From 2005 to 2012, the Director of Study Programmes was Stephen Potts. Friedemann Eichhorn has been Director of Kronberg Academy's study programmes since 2012 and is Co-Artistic Director with Raimund Trenkler.

Artistic council
Kronberg Academy receives active support from many well-known artists. The members of the Artistic Council are Marta Casals Istomin, Yuri Bashmet, Christoph Eschenbach, Gidon Kremer and Sir András Schiff. Cellist Mstislav Rostropovich was also a member of the Artistic Council until his death in 2007. He declared Kronberg to be the "World capital of the cello" as early as 1997, and founded the Rostropovich Cello Foundation in Kronberg to support young cellists.

Concert hall
A new concert hall for the institution, the Casals Forum, was opened in September 2022, with a main hall, a smaller hall and study facilities.

Projects
Numerous renowned international events organised by Kronberg Academy, all designed to inspire, train and shape young musicians, supplement and support the funding activities and regularly make Kronberg a meeting place for artists from across the globe:

Kronberg Academy Festival (every two years since 1993, titled "Cello Festival Kronberg" until 2013)
Cello Masterclasses & Concerts (every two years since 1994)
Violin Masterclasses & Concerts (every two years since 2009)
Viola-Fest (1989 and 2003)
Kronberg Academy in Seoul/South Korea (2004, 2006 and 2008)
Chamber music project "Chamber Music Connects the World" (every two years since 2000)
International Pablo Casals Cello Competition (2000 and 2004)
Grand Prix Emanuel Feuermann, Berlin, organised together with Berlin University of the Arts (every four years since 2002)
Projects for children and teens: "Classic for Kids", "Mit Musik – Miteinander", youth concerts

World-renowned artists have established foundations based in Kronberg:

Rostropovich Cello Foundation
Gidon Kremer Stiftung
Yuri Bashmet Viola Foundation

Kronberg Academy also offers violin, viola and cello tuition for children and teenagers through the Emanuel Feuermann Conservatory. The conservatory is one of three representatives of the Associated Board of the Royal Schools of Music (ABRSM) in the state of Hesse.

Many of Kronberg's residents – who make up most of the 1320 or so members of the Friends of Kronberg Academy – act as hosts for the numerous young string players from around the world who come to Kronberg for its workshops, concerts and festivals.

References

Further reading

External links

Kronberg im Taunus
Music schools in Germany
Educational institutions established in 1993
1993 establishments in Germany